Piano Rags by Scott Joplin is an album by Joshua Rifkin, consisting of ragtime compositions by Scott Joplin, released on the Nonesuch Records label in 1970. The original album's spine and various compact disc reissues render the title as Scott Joplin: Piano Rags. The record is considered to have been the first to reintroduce Joplin's music in the early 1970s, initially gaining critical recognition and later commercial success after several of Joplin's compositions were featured in the 1973 film The Sting. It became Nonesuch Records' first million-selling album.

Personnel
Joshua Rifkin - piano and liner notes
Marc J. Aubort & Joanna Nickrenz - engineering and tape editing (Elite Recordings, Inc.)
Teresa Sterne - coordinator
Robert L. Heimall - cover design and art direction
Saul Lambert - cover art

Track listing
Side One
 "Maple Leaf Rag " (1899) (3:13)
 "The Entertainer" (1902) (4:58)
 "The Ragtime Dance" (1908) (3:13)
 "Gladiolus Rag" (1907) (4:24) 
Side Two
 "Fig Leaf Rag" (1908) (4:38)
 "Scott Joplin's New Rag" (1912) (3:07)
 "Euphonic Sounds" (1909) (3:53)
 "Magnetic Rag" (1914) (5:11)

Album notes
Rifkin provides a brief history of ragtime music,  a biographical sketch of Joplin, and musical analysis of his compositions. He notes, "The awakening of interest in black culture and history during the last decade has not yet resurrected Joplin and his contemporaries, who remain barely known beyond a growing coterie of ragtime devotees. Yet it offers a perfect opportunity to discover the beauties of his music and accord him the honor that he deserves."

Reception
The album was released in November 1970 and sold 100,000 copies in its first year and eventually became Nonesuch's first million-selling record. Record stores found themselves for the first time putting ragtime in the classical music section. The album was nominated in 1971 for two Grammy Award categories: Best Album Notes and Best Instrumental Soloist Performance (without orchestra). The Billboard "Best-Selling Classical LPs" chart for 28 September 1974 has the record at #5, with the follow-up "Volume 2" at #4, and a combined set of both volumes at #3. Separately both volumes had been on the chart for 64 weeks. In 1979 Alan Rich in the New York Magazine wrote that by giving artists like Rifkin the opportunity to put Joplin's music on record Nonesuch Records "created, almost alone, the Scott Joplin revival."

In January 1971, Harold C. Schonberg, music critic at The New York Times, having just heard the album, wrote a featured Sunday edition article entitled "Scholars, Get Busy on Scott Joplin!" Schonberg's call to action has been described as the catalyst for classical music scholars, the sort of people Joplin had battled all his life, to conclude that Joplin was a genius.

Charts

Reissues
Nonesuch reissued the album on CD, with nine additional tracks.

Follow-up albums
Nonesuch followed up the album with Scott Joplin: Piano Rags, Vol. II and Scott Joplin: Piano Rags, Vol. III, both featuring Rifkin.

References

Sources

Scott Joplin
1970 albums
Nonesuch Records albums
Joshua Rifkin albums